Indian peacock softshell turtle (Nilssonia hurum) is a species of turtle found in South Asia, and is listed on the IUCN Red List as a vulnerable species.

Geographical range
The Indian peacock soft-shell turtle is found in Bangladesh, India (the states of Mizoram, Assam, Bihar, Madhya Pradesh, Odisha, Rajasthan, Uttar Pradesh, West Bengal), Nepal and Pakistan.
Type locality in India: Fatehgarh, Ganges, to Barrackpore (about 23 kilometers north of Calcutta), West Bengal, India".

References

Bibliography

Further reading
 Safi, A., Khan, M. Z.,2014. Distribution and current population of freshwater turtles of District Charsadda of Khyber Pakhtunkhwa, Pakistan. The Journal of Zoology studies. 1(4): 31–38. http://www.journalofzoology.com
 Anderson, J. 1872 Note on Trionyx gangeticus, and Trionyx hurum, B. Hamilton. Ann. Mag. Nat. Hist. (4) 9: 382-383
 Anderson, J. 1872 On Trionyx gangeticus, Cuvier, Trionyx hurum, B.H. and Dr. Gray. Ann. Mag. Nat. Hist. (4) 10: 219-222
 Gray, J. E. 1831 A synopsis of the species of Class Reptilia. In: Griffith, E & E. Pidgeon: The animal kingdom arranged in conformity with its organisation by the Baron Cuvier with additional descriptions of all the species hither named, and of many before noticed [Vol. 9]. Whittaker, Treacher and Co., London: 481 + 110 pp.
 Gray, J.E. 1872 On Indian Mud-Tortoises (Trionyx). Ann. Mag. Nat. Hist. (4) 9: 473-475
 Meylan, P.A. 1987 The phylogenetic relationships of soft-shelled turtles (Family Trionychidae). Bulletin of the American Museum of Natural History 186 (1):1-101.

Nilssonia (turtle)
Reptiles of Pakistan
Reptiles of India
Reptiles of Nepal
Reptiles of Bangladesh
Reptiles described in 1831